Zach Zulli (born May 1, 1991) is an indoor American football quarterback who is a free agent. He played college football for the Shippensburg Red Raiders from 2009-2013. Zulli won the Harlon Hill Trophy as the top player in the NCAA Division II in 2012 in his junior year at Shippensburg University of Pennsylvania.

College
In 2012, Zulli led Shippensburg to an overall record of eleven wins and two losses (11–2) and to the second round of the playoffs. During the season, he led all divisions of college football for the 2012 season with his 54 touchdown passes and 4,747 passing yards. He also tied the NCAA Division II record for touchdown passes in a single season and established new records for both total points scored (344) and total touchdowns (57). In recognition of his season, Zulli was awarded the 2012 Harlon Hill Trophy as the top player in NCAA Division II football. As he won the award as a junior, Zulli became only the seventh underclassman to win the award and the first since Danny Woodhead in 2006.

Professional
After the 2014 NFL Draft Zulli received a phone call from the Seattle Seahawks to attend the 2014 rookie mini-camp on a tryout basis.  Zulli was not signed after displaying an impressive win during the team scrimmage with stats of 12-19 for 132 yards and a touchdown. Although Zulli wasn't signed by the team, he made a good impression on head coach Pete Carroll. After Zulli's tryout with the Seahawks he signed a professional contract with the Montreal Alouettes on June 25, 2014 where he will be on their practice roster. After originally signing with the Harrisburg Stampede, Zulli became a free agent when the Stampede suspended operations on December 30, 2014. He was signed by the Lehigh Valley Steelhawks, also of the Professional Indoor Football League.

References

External links
Shippensburg Red Raiders bio
Zulli Wins 2012 Harlon Hill
Seattle Rookie Mini-Camp Review

1991 births
Living people
American football quarterbacks
Canadian football quarterbacks
American players of Canadian football
Shippensburg Red Raiders football players
Harrisburg Stampede players
Lehigh Valley Steelhawks players
People from Montgomery County, Pennsylvania
Players of American football from Pennsylvania
Montreal Alouettes players